Ralph Waterbury Ellis (November 25, 1856 – September 28, 1945) was an American lawyer, banker and  politician who served in the Massachusetts House of Representatives, as a member of the Springfield, Massachusetts Board of Aldermen and Common Council, and as the Mayor of Springfield in 1902.

Biography

Ralph W. Ellis was born to Theodore Waterbury and Maria Louise (Van Boskerck) in South Hadley Falls, Massachusetts, November 25, 1856.

He graduated from Harvard University cum laude in 1879, and from Harvard Law School in 1881.

He died at his home in Springfield on September 28, 1945.

Notes

1856 births
1945 deaths
Harvard College alumni
Harvard Law School alumni
Springfield, Massachusetts City Council members
Republican Party members of the Massachusetts House of Representatives
Mayors of Springfield, Massachusetts